In 615, during the ongoing war with the Byzantine Empire, the Sasanian army under spahbod Shahin invaded Asia Minor and reached Chalcedon, across the Bosporus from Constantinople. It was at this point, according to Sebeos, that Heraclius had agreed to stand down and was about ready to become a client of the Sasanian emperor Khosrow II, allowing the Roman Empire to become a Persian client state, as well as even allow Khosrow II to choose the emperor. The Sassanids had already captured Roman Syria and Palestine in the previous year. After negotiations with Byzantine Emperor Heraclius, a Byzantine ambassador was sent to Persian Shahanshah Khosrau II, and Shahin withdrew again to Syria.

This was not the first time the Persians drew up their armies at the walls of Constantinople, but this time the invasion was more widespread. Beginning in 614 the Persians encroached on Asia Minor. In 614 they captured Melitene and Shahin divided his armies in two, one army marching to sack Sardis and Miletus and his army move towards Chalcedon. Despite the successful retreat back to Syria, the Persians did keep Caesarea (modern Kayseri) and the key Armenian fortresses of Theodosiopolis (modern Erzurum) and Martyropolis. According to Sebeos, when they reached Chalcedon in 615, Heraclius had agreed to stand down and was about ready to become a client of the Sasanian emperor Khosrow II, allowing the Roman Empire to become a Persian client state, as well as even allow Khosrow II to choose the emperor.

a Heraclius sent a separate letter to Shahin, stating his willingness to accept whoever was appointed by the Sasanians as the ruler of Byzantium. These efforts were failed but the Byzantine capital was not attacked, because the Sasanians preferred to focus on Egypt, which was of higher economic value than the war-torn Anatolia.

See Also

 Byzantine–Sasanian War of 602–628

References

Sources 

615
610s conflicts
Battles involving the Byzantine Empire
610s in the Sasanian Empire
610s in the Byzantine Empire
Battles in medieval Anatolia
Battles of the Byzantine–Sasanian War of 602–628